David C. Martin (born July 28, 1943) is an American television news correspondent, journalist and author who works for CBS News.  He is currently the network's National Security Correspondent reporting from The Pentagon, a position he has held since 1993. Martin has contributed reports to the CBS Evening News, 60 Minutes, and 48 Hours.

Early life and career
Martin was born July 28, 1943, in Washington, D.C. He graduated from Yale University in 1965 with a degree in English. He served during the Vietnam War as a naval officer. Martin began at CBS News as a researcher in 1969. His career during the 1970s and early 1980s included stints at Newsweek Magazine and the Associated Press. He became CBS News Pentagon correspondent in 1983.

Works 

Martin, David C.; Walcott John (1988). Best Laid Plans: The Inside Story of America's War Against Terrorism. New York: HarperCollins.

References

External links
Journalist/Correspondent David Martin bio at CBS News website

C-SPAN Q&A interview with Martin, March 28, 2010

1943 births
American newspaper reporters and correspondents
Living people
Writers from Macon, Georgia
CBS News people